Kevin Saurette (born June 27, 1980) is a Canadian former professional ice hockey forward.

Saurette began his professional career in 2006 in the ECHL for the Reading Royals where his spell also included two loan spells with the Binghamton Senators of the American Hockey League. In 2008, Saurette moved to Germany and played for ESV Kaufbeuren of the third-tier Oberliga where he scored 98 points in 59 games. In 2009 he moved to ETC Crimmitschau in the 2nd Bundesliga and stayed for two seasons before moving to the Fischtown Pinguins in 2011. 

He then returned to Kaufbeuren in 2012, who were now played in the 2nd Bundesliga, but left after 25 games and signed for the Belfast Giants in the Elite Ice Hockey League.

Saurette has worked as executive for the Manitoba Junior Hockey League since 2016 and been the league's commissioner since June 2020.

References

External links
 

1980 births
Living people
Belfast Giants players
Binghamton Senators players
Canadian expatriate ice hockey players in Northern Ireland
Canadian expatriate ice hockey players in Germany
Canadian expatriate ice hockey players in the United States
Canadian ice hockey forwards
ETC Crimmitschau players
ESV Kaufbeuren players
Fischtown Pinguins players
Manitoba Bisons ice hockey players
Manitoba Junior Hockey League executives
Reading Royals players
Regina Pats players
Ice hockey people from Winnipeg
University of Manitoba alumni